Lisa Seminara is American politician from the state of Connecticut. She is the senator for the 8th Senate District and is a member of the Republican Party. She is currently serving her first term, and was elected in November 2022.

References

Republican Party Connecticut state senators
Women state legislators in Connecticut
Year of birth missing (living people)
Living people